The soil seed bank is the natural storage of seeds, often dormant, within the soil of most ecosystems.  The study of soil seed banks started in 1859 when Charles Darwin observed the emergence of seedlings using soil samples from the bottom of a lake. The first scientific paper on the subject was published in 1882 and reported on the occurrence of seeds at different soil depths.  Weed seed banks have been studied intensely in agricultural science because of their important economic impacts; other fields interested in soil seed banks include forest regeneration and restoration ecology.

Henry David Thoreau wrote that the contemporary popular belief explaining the succession of a logged forest, specifically to trees of a dissimilar species to the trees cut down, was that seeds either spontaneously generated in the soil, or sprouted after lying dormant for centuries. However, he dismissed this idea, noting that heavy nuts unsuited for distribution by wind were distributed instead by animals.

Background 

Many taxa have been classified according to the longevity of their seeds in the soil seed bank.  Seeds of transient species remain viable in the soil seed bank only to the next opportunity to germinate, while seeds of  persistent species can survive longer than the next opportunity—often much longer than one year.  Species with seeds that remain viable in the soil longer than five years form the long-term persistent seed bank, while species whose seeds generally germinate or die within one to five years are called short-term persistent. A typical long-term persistent species is Chenopodium album (Lambsquarters); its seeds commonly remain viable in the soil for up to 40 years and in rare situations perhaps as long as 1,600 years.   A species forming no soil seed bank at all (except the dry season between ripening and the first autumnal rains) is Agrostemma githago (Corncockle), which was formerly a widespread cereal weed.

Seed longevity 

Longevity of seeds is very variable and depends on many factors; few species exceed 100 years. In typical soils the longevity of seeds can range from nearly zero (germinating immediately when reaching the soil or even before) to several hundred years. Some of the oldest still-viable seeds were those of Lotus (Nelumbo nucifera) found buried in the soil of a pond; these seeds were estimated by carbon dating to be around 1,200 years old. One cultivar of date palm, the Judean date palm, successfully sprouted in 2008 after accidental storage for 2,000 years.

One of the longest-running soil seed viability trials was started in Michigan in 1879 by James Beal. The experiment involved the burying of 20 bottles holding 50 seeds from 21 species. Every five years, a bottle from every species was retrieved and germinated on a tray of sterilized soil which was kept in a growth chamber. Later, after responsibility for managing the experiment was delegated to caretakers, the period between retrievals became longer. In 1980, more than 100 years after the trial was started, seeds of only three species were observed to germinate: moth mullein (Verbascum blattaria), common mullein (Verbascum thapsus) and common mallow (Malva neglecta).

Environmental significance 

Soil seed banks are a crucial part of the rapid re-vegetation of sites disturbed by wildfire, catastrophic weather, agricultural operations, and timber harvesting, a natural process known as secondary succession. Soil seed banks are often dominated by pioneer species, those species that are specially adapted to return to an environment first after a disturbance. Forest ecosystems and wetlands contain a number of specialized plant species forming persistent soil seed banks. 

Before the advent of herbicides, a good example of a persistent seed bank species was Papaver rhoeas, sometimes so abundant in agricultural fields in Europe that it could be mistaken for a crop.

The absence of a soil seed bank impedes the establishment of vegetation during primary succession, while presence of a well-stocked soil seed bank permits rapid development of species-rich ecosystems during secondary succession.

Population densities and diversity 

The mortality of seeds in the soil is one of the key factors for the persistence and density fluctuations of plant populations, especially for annual plants. Studies on the genetic structure of  Androsace septentrionalis populations in the seed bank compared to those of established plants showed that diversity within populations is higher below ground than above ground.

There are indications that mutations are more important for species forming a persistent seed bank compared to those with only transient seeds. The increase of species richness in a plant community due to a species-rich and abundant soil seed bank is known as the storage effect.

Species of Striga (witchweed) are known to leave some of the highest seed densities in the soil compared to other plant genera; this is a major factor that aids their invasive potential. Each plant has the capability to produce between 90,000 and 450,000 seeds, although a majority of these seeds are not viable. It has been estimated that only two witchweeds would produce enough seeds required to refill a seed bank after seasonal losses.

Associated ecosystem processes 
The term soil diaspore bank can be used to include non-flowering plants such as ferns and bryophytes.

In addition to seeds, perennial plants have vegetative propagules to facilitate forming new plants, migration into new ground, or reestablishment after being top-killed.  These propagules are collectively called the 'soil bud bank', and include dormant and adventitious buds on stolons, rhizomes, and bulbs.

The relationship between soil seed bank and aboveground vegetation 
Soil seed bank is significant breeding source for vegetation restoration and species-rich vegetation restoration, as they provide memories of past vegetation and represent the structure of future population.  Soil seed bank did not very differ in overall seed density or species diversity, and there was little relative between the species composition of the seed bank and the composition of the aboveground vegetation.  These two facts could lead to the conclusion that the species composition of the aboveground vegetation and the soil bank can differ.  Additionally, it is a key point that the relationship between soil seed bank and original potential to measure the revegetation potential. In endangered habitats, such as mudflats, rare and critically endangered species may be present in high densities within the soil seed bank and survive between 50 years or a century.

References

Plant reproduction
Seeds
Gene banks
Ecological restoration
Biology terminology
Habitat
Environmental terminology
Biorepositories